Ces dames s'en mêlent is a 1965 French-Italian international co-production film directed by Raoul André starring Eddie Constantine in a sequel to Jeff Gordon, Secret Agent (1963).

Plot
Jeff Gordon is a financial agent of the FBI section that fights against counterfeiting of dollars. Gordon went to Paris to infiltrate and stop the tape forgers  headed by Thomas the printer. His work is so perfect that counterfeits are difficult to detect. One of counterfeiters thinks he recognizes Jeff as a mobster who wants to take revenge on them.

Cast

 Eddie Constantine as Jeff Gordon
 Patricia Viterbo as Angelica
 Annie Cordy as Lily
 Roger Dutoit as Angelo
 Carla Marlier as Wanda
 Hubert de Lapparent as Alfred
 Philippe Mareuil as Ericson
 Dorothée Blanck as Isabelle
 Jean Gras as Tony
 Guy Marly as Mario
 Manuel Vargas as Zacharoff
 Alain Nobis as Cora
 Jany Clair
 Nino Ferrer
 Dominique Zardi

References

External links
 

1965 films
Italian crime drama films
French crime drama films
French sequel films
1960s Italian-language films
Films directed by Raoul André
1960s Italian films
1960s French films